The 2022 Vancouver International Film Festival, the 41st event in the history of the Vancouver International Film Festival, was held from September 29 to October 9, 2022. The festival opened with the Marie Clements film Bones of Crows, and closed with Hirokazu Kore-eda's film Broker.

The festival scheduled 135 feature films and 102 short films overall. All films were screened in-person, although a selection of films was also available throughout British Columbia on the online VIFF Connects platform.

The most noted change at the 2022 festival is the introduction of Vanguard, a competitive program for films by emerging directors. The festival will present a $5,000 award to the film selected as the best film in that program. Some of the festival's programs have also been renamed from past years, including the Canadian film program being renamed from True North to Northern Lights and the Music/Art/Design (M/A/D) program for documentary films about the arts being renamed to Portraits.

Awards
Juried award winners were announced on October 7, 2022, with audience award winners announced following the conclusion of the festival.

Films

Galas and special presentations

Showcase

Panorama

Vanguard

Northern Lights

Insights

Spectrum

Portraits

Altered States

Short Forum

International Shorts

Reel Youth

Modes

References

Vancouver
Vancouver
Vancouver
Vancouver International Film Festival